Park Se-jin (born 15 December 1995) is a South Korean footballer who plays as full back for Busan IPark in K League 2.

Career
Park joined K League Challenge side Daegu FC in January 2016. He made his professional debut in the opening game of the 2016 season against Daejeon Citizen on 26 March.

References

External links 

1995 births
Living people
Association football fullbacks
South Korean footballers
Daegu FC players
Suwon FC players
Gimcheon Sangmu FC players
Chungnam Asan FC players
Busan IPark players
K League 2 players
K League 1 players
Yeungnam University alumni